Sarsa Dengel (1550 – 4 October 1597), also known as Sarsa the Great, was Emperor of Ethiopia, and a member of the Solomonic dynasty. His throne name was throne name Malak Sagad I (መለክ ሰገድ ).

Biography
The son of Emperor Menas and Empress Admas Mogasa, and thus hailing from the Amhara people, Sarsa Dengel was elected king by the Shewan commanders of the army and the Dowager Empress. He was barely fourteen years old, but was supported by the Amhara aristocracy who feared Tigrayan influence in the person of Yishaq who frequently aligned with the Ottomans. Upon his coming of age, Sarsa Dengel had to put down a number of revolts: such as his cousin Hamalmal in 1563 at the Battle of Endagabatan, and another by his cousin Fasil two years later.

Sarsa Dengel moved the center of the empire from Shewa to Begemder, especially around the Lake Tana area where he established his imperial residence and built many castles.

War against the Ottomans 

When the Ottomans withdrew from Debarwa the regional ruler, Bahr Negus Yeshaq, immediately decided to occupy it and form an alliance with them. Sarsa Dengel was angered by what he considered his vassal's arrogance and treachery, and marched against them in 1576. A year later he faced the army of Yeshaq somewhere in Tigray where he utterly defeated Bahr Negash's forces and killed Yeshaq in battle. The victorious Emperor then advanced on Debarwa whereupon the Turkish garrison surrendered with all its firearms. Sarsa Dengel then seized the vast riches stored by the Turks in Debarwa and ordered the destruction of the mosque and the fort erected during the Ottoman occupation.

In 1577, Emperor Sarsa Dengel defeated and executed Adal Sultan Muhammad V in Bale. After the ruler of Hadiya's refusal to pay tribute to Sarsa Dengel, the Emperor invaded the region and wiped out an entire contingent of Malassay sent by the Sultanate of Harar, an ally of the Ottomans, at the Battle of Hadiya.

In 1587, the Turks left the port of Hirgigo and advanced inland to take Debarwa again. The Turks defeated the governor of Hamasien who fled to Tigray. Upon hearing this, Sarsa Dengel mobilized his forces and crossed the Mereb river to repel the Turkish invaders who were pillaging the countryside. He advanced to Debarwa and then continued to Hirgigo where the Turkish commander Kadawred Pasha was killed. The Turks then gave a peace offering to the Emperor and withdrew from Hirgigo handing it over to a local Beja chief.

Campaigns against the Oromo 

In the 1570s several Oromo tribes had begun migrating north towards Abyssinia. In 1572 Sarsa Dengel fought off a raid by the Borana Oromo under a luba named Ambissa near Lake Zway. In 1574 after finding out the Oromo had conquered the province of Wej the Emperor gathered his forces from throughout Ethiopia to form an army at Gind Beret. From there, Sarsa Dengel headed south, where he found that the Oromo had also taken Maya. Sarsa Dengel was able to defeat the Oromo forcing them to flee towards Fatager.

In 1576 Sarsa Dengel learned of Oromo raids in Shewa, but was too busy fighting the Ottomans in the north. The Emperor sent Azzaj Halibo with 50 cavalry to expel the Oromos from the area, Halibo then sent the heads of 80 Oromo chiefs back to the Emperor.

After defeating the Ottoman backed Yeshaq  in the north, in 1578 Sarsa Dengel moved south to confront the Oromo in Shewa, the Emperor defeated the Borana Oromo in Mojjo Valley (just east of modern Addis Ababa), according to Bahrey the corpses of dead Oromos were strewn all over the surrounding countryside.

Under luba Mul'eta a large Oromo raid was made on Gojjam in 1586. With the Ottoman situation in the north largely under control, Sarsa Dengel again took the initiative against the Oromo in the south, where he forced the Dawé Oromo in Wej to flee. Bahrey praised Sarsa Dengel's campaign, stating that he "did not act according to the custom of the kings his ancestors, who, when making war were in the habit of sending their troops ahead, remaining themselves in the rear with the pick of their cavalry and infantry, praising those who went forward bravely and punishing those who lagged behind."

Later campaigns 

Sarsa Dengel campaigned against the Beta Israel in Semien province in 1580, and again in 1585. He also campaigned against the Agaw in 1581, and in 1585. He campaigned against the Gambo who dwelled in the lands west of the Chomen swamp in 1590. Sarsa Dengel campaigned in Ennarea twice, the first time in 1586, and the second time in 1597. On the final campaign against the Oromo, his Chronicle records, a group of monks tried to dissuade him from this expedition; failing that, they warned him not to eat fish from a certain river he would pass. Despite their warning, when he passed by the river the monks warned him about, he ate fish taken from this river and grew sick and died.

His body was interred in Medhane Alem church on Rema Island. When Robert Ernest Cheesman visited the church in March 1933, he was shown a blue-and-white porcelain jar, which his entrails were brought from the place of his death.

Legacy 
According to Professor Mordechai Abir, “the many historians who described sersa Dangel as an able, heroic, and successful monarch completely distorted the truth.” Sarsa Dengel's obsession to consolidate his government in the Beta Israel provinces in the north instead of focusing all of his resources and attention in the south to stop the Oromo expansions was a turning point in Ethiopian history. This disastrous decision opened the Ethiopian plateau for the Oromo migration and sparked off a chain of reaction which lead to the final decline of the Ethiopian Empire.

References 

1550 births
1597 deaths
16th-century monarchs in Africa
16th-century emperors of Ethiopia
Emperors of Ethiopia
Solomonic dynasty